On August 9, 2002, the Basque separatist organization, ETA, placed an explosive in the toilets of a hamburger restaurant, located a few meters from a tourist office, the Alicante town of Torrevieja. No one died or was injured, although it caused serious material damage.

ETA claimed responsibility for the attack through a call to the Basque newspaper Gara, which also said it had placed a bomb on the beach in Santa Pola, which was found days later in palm trees.

See also 
 List of ETA attacks

References

ETA (separatist group) actions
Terrorist incidents in Spain
Alicante
Attacks on restaurants in Europe
2002 crimes in Spain
Terrorist incidents in Spain in 2002